The 1993–94 Division 1 season was the 56th since its establishment. Paris Saint-Germain became champions for the second time in their history with 59 points.

Promotion and relegation

Teams promoted from 1992–93 Division 2
 Champions: Martigues
 Runners-up: Angers
 Play-off: Cannes

Teams relegated to 1993–94 Division 2
 18th Place: Valenciennes
 19th Place: Toulon
 20th Place: Nîmes

League table

Results

Top goalscorers

References

Ligue 1 seasons
France
1